Mores (alternatively Ko or Farmores) is an Oceanic language spoken in central Espiritu Santo Island in Vanuatu.

References

Espiritu Santo languages
Languages of Vanuatu
Severely endangered languages